Sir Geoffrey Nice KC (born 21 October 1945) is a British barrister and judge. He took part in the International Criminal Tribunal for the Former Yugoslavia and was lead prosecutor at Slobodan Milošević's trial. He is chair of the China Tribunal and the Uyghur Tribunal, which have investigated human rights abuses in China.

Life and career

Early life
Nice's family home was in Catford, where he attended St Dunstan's College, and later Keble College, Oxford. He became a barrister in 1971 and was appointed Queen's Counsel in 1990. Since 1984, he has been a part-time judge at the Old Bailey. Geoffrey Nice was made a Knight Bachelor in 2007. In 2009, he was named Vice-Chair of the Bar Standards Board. In 2012 he was appointed the Professor of Law at Gresham College, a position formerly occupied by Baroness Deech.

Prosecutor career
Nice has been involved with the International Criminal Tribunal for the Former Yugoslavia (ICTY). He was lead prosecutor at the trial of Slobodan Milošević in The Hague and initiated the prosecution's initial case of linking atrocities committed in the former Yugoslavia to Milosevic. He prosecuted the ICTY cases of the Bosnian Croat Dario Kordić and the successful prosecution of Goran Jelisić. Since working with the ICTY, Nice has been active in the International Criminal Court (ICC) and in pro bono work for victims groups. His practice includes human rights/public law and personal injury.

In August 2010, Judith Armatta, a journalist who followed the proceedings in the ICTY, had published a book titled, Twilight of Impunity: The War Crimes Trial of Slobodan Milosevic. On 16 December 2010, Geoffrey Nice reviewed this book on London Review of Books. In his review, Nice criticized the ICTY for its decisions during the trial of Slobodan Milosevic, the president of the former Yugoslavia. Nice alleged that the prosecutor of the ICTY, Carla Del Ponte had compromised with Slobodan Milosevic, which then led to a failure of Bosnia-Herzegovina in their genocide case against Serbia in February 2007. Nice also expressed his opinion about Slobodan Milosevic, evaluating that the former president was "inept" and "died before judgment was given".

He was appointed Honorary Doctor of Laws, University of Kent in 2005, and was knighted in 2007 for services to International Criminal Justice.

In 2009, a conviction Nice had presided over was ordered quashed and retried after a Privy Council Appeal found his handling of the case had resulted in an unfair hearing. One reason that Nice was criticized by the Privy Council for his unfair handling in the trial of a St. Helier-based accountant Peter Michel. Michel was accused of ten counts of money laundering in 2007 and was sentenced to six years in prison. In 2009, however, the Privy Council quashed the conviction against Michel, and said that Nice had been snide and sarcastic during the trial, such action had rendered the trial unfair. In the same report, the Jersey Evening Post claimed that the actions could have cost the Jersey taxpayers "millions of pounds."

He co-authored the 2014 Syrian detainee report.

China Tribunal and Uyghur Tribunal
Nice was the chair of the China Tribunal, commissioned by the International Coalition to End Transplant Abuse in China (ETAC) and some Falun Gong practitioners. The tribunal focused on the issue of forced organ harvesting from prisoners of conscience in China.

Nice was asked to become the head of 2021 Uyghur Tribunal by the World Uyghur Congress, the congress represents exiled Uyghurs.

Chinese sanctions
In 2021, in retaliation for sanctions issued against Chinese officials by the United States, European Union and United Kingdom, the People's Republic of China issued sanctions against Nice that banned him from entering territory that the country controls or from doing business with Chinese persons. A spokesman for the Chinese Foreign Ministry said in a statement that these sanctions were issued due to Nice's spreading of what the Chinese government calls "lies and disinformation" surrounding China's policies regarding Xinjiang.

Politics
In the 1983 United Kingdom general election and 1987 United Kingdom general election, he was the Social Democratic Party candidate for Dover.

References

1945 births
Living people
Alumni of Keble College, Oxford
British human rights activists
British barristers
Knights Bachelor
Lawyers awarded knighthoods
Professors of Gresham College
People from Catford
20th-century King's Counsel
21st-century King's Counsel
Judiciary of Jersey
Lawyers from London